Air Nostrum, legally incorporated as Air Nostrum Líneas Aéreas del Mediterráneo, S.A., is a Spanish regional airline based in Valencia.

It currently operates as a franchisee of Iberia as Iberia Regional and an affiliate member of the Oneworld airline alliance. Air Nostrum operates 91 domestic and international routes to 51 destinations, and charter flights. Its main base is Valencia Airport, with hubs at Barcelona Airport and Madrid-Barajas Airport.
Limited operations are also carried out on behalf of Brussels Airlines, replacing related wet-lease specialist airline CityJet, having begun in late 2018.

Air Nostrum is also a part owner of Iryo, a Spanish high-speed rail service which began operating in November 2022.

History

The airline was established on 23 May 1994 and started operations on 15 December.

Air Nostrum used to offer a comprehensive meal service on all scheduled flights. In early 2008, the airline eliminated its 'regional business class' cabin. The cabin is now split into separate business and economy sections along the lines of other major airlines. Economy passengers can purchase drinks and snacks from an onboard menu.

On February 7, 2012, Air Nostrum presented an ERE (a legal form of workforce reduction and redundancies) that will affect its 1,800 workers for two years, due to the increase in fuel prices and the drop in income. It is estimated that during the two years, 15 Bombardier CRJ200 aircraft will be grounded and most of its routes will be abandoned at a loss.

On March 31, 2014, Air Nostrum announced the entry into the company's capital of a group of Valencian businessmen with the participation of the then CEO of the company, Carlos Bertomeu, as well as Antonio Pellicer and José Remohí, owners of the IVI, with an estimated capital of 25 million euros, divided between capital and debt.

In September 2017, Air Nostrum filed an application to operate high speed rail services from Madrid Atocha to Gare de Montpellier-Saint-Roch in Southern France from 5 October 2018 with AVE Class 100 trains leased from Renfe Operadora.

On 17 July 2018, Air Nostrum and CityJet of Ireland announced they would merge to form the largest regional airline in Europe, however will remain as separate brands. 

In June 2022, it was announced that Air Nostrum had placed a reservation on ten Hybrid Air Vehicles Airlander 10 airships. Introduction to service is scheduled for 2026.

Destinations

Fleet

As of December 2022, the Air Nostrum fleet consists of the following aircraft:

Incidents and accidents
On 17 January 2003, an Air Nostrum Fokker 50 overran the runway at Melilla Airport and crashed into the perimeter fence resulting in the aircraft splitting into two major parts. Nine passengers were injured.

On 24 January 2006, Air Nostrum flight IB 8665 from Valladolid made a belly landing at Barcelona El Prat Airport. Two of the forty passengers sustained minor injuries while disembarking from the aircraft, a Bombardier CRJ200 with registration EC-IBM. The cause was determined by the Comisión de Investigación de Accidentes e Incidentes de Aviación Civil to be pilot error.

References

External links

Official website

Airlines established in 1994
Airlines of Spain
Companies based in the Valencian Community
European Regions Airline Association
Iberia (airline)
Oneworld affiliate members
Railway companies of Spain
Spanish brands
Transport in Valencia
Spanish companies established in 1994
Railway companies established in 1994